Yaka is a large village in the Başmakçı District, Afyonkarahisar Province, Turkey. Its population is 592 (2021). It is located southeast by road from the district capital of Başmakçı, on the way to Ovacık. Before the 2013 reorganisation, it was a town (belde).

References

External links
Video

Villages in Başmakçı District